Bradley Dalton (born 12 September 1959) is an Australian former basketball player, who played for the City of Sydney Astronauts (1979–1980), West Adelaide Bearcats (1981–1982), Sydney Supersonics (1983), Geelong Supercats (1984–1987) and the Sydney Kings (1988–1991) in the NBL.

Early life and family
Born in Sydney, New South Wales, Dalton attended St. Augustine's College in Brookvale, a suburb on the Northern Beaches of Sydney. He is the older brother of former NBL player and Olympian, Mark Dalton and brother of Karen Dalton, who also represented Australia at the 1984 and 1988 Summer Olympics.

Career
Dalton, a 6'8" (203 cm) tall Power forward who could also play at Centre, won the NBL championship in 1982 with the West Adelaide Bearcats, a team that included 1982 NBL MVP Al Green, future three-time league MVP Leroy Loggins, Boomers Peter Ali and Ray Wood, as well as the NBL's inaugural MVP winner in 1979, player/coach Ken Richardson. The Bearcats defeated the Geelong Supercats 80–74 in the Grand Final held at the Broadmeadow Basketball Stadium in Newcastle.

International
Dalton represented Australia at the 1984 Summer Olympic Games in Los Angeles and again in 1988 in Seoul.

References

1959 births
Living people
Australian men's basketball players
1982 FIBA World Championship players
Basketball players at the 1984 Summer Olympics
Basketball players at the 1988 Summer Olympics
Basketball players from Sydney
Centers (basketball)
Geelong Supercats players
Olympic basketball players of Australia
Power forwards (basketball)
Sydney Kings players
1986 FIBA World Championship players